Mickey's Very Merry Christmas Party also known as MVMCP is an event hosted at Disney's Magic Kingdom on select nights all throughout November and December in the lead-up to Christmas. It features holiday entertainment such as a parade, dance parties, character meet-and-greets, and complimentary treat stations. The event runs from 7:00 pm to midnight, but party guests can enter starting from 4:00 pm. Entrance to Mickey's Very Merry Christmas Party requires a separate ticket from regular general admission.

History 
MVMCP started in 1983.

In 2014, A Frozen Holiday Wish replaced another show that featured Cinderella and her Fairy Godmother.

Celebrate the Season, the show on the stage in front of Cinderella's Castle, was replaced by Mickey's Most Merriest Celebration Stage Show in 2016.

From 2003 until November 8, 2019, a holiday edition of the Wishes fireworks show, Holiday Wishes, occurred during the party. It included a medley of the original Wishes soundtrack with some Christmas season songs mixed in. The show started with Tinker Bell flying over the castle with narration by Jiminy Cricket. Along with the fireworks, there was a lighting display project onto Cinderella Castle with Santa Claus, and illuminating the castle green so it resembled a Christmas tree.

On June 23, 2022, Disney announced that Mickey's Very Merry Christmas Party would return to the Magic Kingdom after being cancelled in 2020 due to COVID-19.

Events

Mickey's Once Upon A Christmastime Parade
The parade has two performance times on its given night and its route takes it down Main Street, USA. The parade features Disney characters like Mickey and Minnie Mouse along with numerous others such as; Goofy, Chip "n" Dale, Winnie the Pooh, Tigger, Marching Toy Soldiers, Dancing Reindeer, Gingerbread men, and Ole Saint Nick.

Minnie's Wonderful Christmastime Fireworks
Minnie Mouse hosts an exclusive, festive firework display featuring famous Christmas carols such as Deck the Halls and We Wish You a Merry Christmas.

Shows

Mickey's Most Merriest Celebration Stage Show
Shown four times during the night, Mickey's Most Merriest Celebration show can be seen on the stage in front of Cinderella's Castle. This show stars Disney characters such as Mickey and Minnie, Pluto, Donald Duck, Goofy, Snow White, Dopey, Clarabelle Cow, and Woody and Jessie dressed up in their Christmas outfits. In addition to characters, there are also live performers singing and dancing to classic Christmas carols.

A Frozen Holiday Wish
During the month of November, Cinderella Castle is covered in 200,000 LED lights to resemble being frosted in ice and snow — an effect called Castle Dream Lights on Cinderella Castle. At dusk, there is a short show featuring the characters from Frozen in which Elsa uses her ice powers to frost over the castle. This show can be viewed by all guests every night during the holiday season and is repeated again during the time of the exclusive Mickey's Very Merry Christmas Party.

A Totally Tomorrowland Christmas Show
A Totally Tomorrowland Christmas Show is a twenty-minute performance featured several times a night on the Tomorrowland stage. This show features Buzz Lightyear and Mike Wazowski teaching Stitch the meaning of Christmas before Buzz Lightyear laser blasts Santa out of the sky.

Character meetups 
Numerous characters appear throughout the Magic Kingdom to meet guests and take pictures. The characters are dressed in holiday themes exclusive to the Christmas season. Along with the regular characters who appear in the park, some rare characters, such as the seven dwarfs, make appearances for special events.

There are also generally two character dance parties throughout the night. Dance parties provide guests with the opportunity to dance with Disney characters like Woody, Jessie, and Bullseye. In the past, dance parties have been held in the Diamond Horseshoe and Cosmic Ray's Starlight Café.

Rides and Attractions 
Popular attractions will be open throughout the party. In the past, some attractions that have been open are The Haunted Mansion, Space Mountain, and Buzz Lightyear's Space Ranger Spin. The rides that are open are not guaranteed to be the same every year.

Jingle Cruise 
While not exclusive to the party, Jingle Cruise is limited to the Christmas season after debuting in 2013. The original Jungle Cruise ride is modified to include a Christmas theme throughout the queue, the boat's names are changed, and the skippers have updated holiday jokes.

Food 
There are numerous complimentary snack stations set up around the park. In addition to the traditional cookies and hot chocolate, some locations also offer snow cones, eggnog, pretzels, and chocolate milk.

See also 
Disney Parks Christmas Day Parade

References

External links 
 
Mickey's Very Merry Christmas Party Photo Gallery

Events at Walt Disney World
Walt Disney Parks and Resorts
Magic Kingdom
Christmas and holiday season parades
Christmas in Florida